Niedźwiady may refer to the following places:
Niedźwiady, Jarocin County in Greater Poland Voivodeship (west-central Poland)
Niedźwiady, Nakło County in Kuyavian-Pomeranian Voivodeship (north-central Poland)
Niedźwiady, Żnin County in Kuyavian-Pomeranian Voivodeship (north-central Poland)
Niedźwiady, Kalisz County in Greater Poland Voivodeship (west-central Poland)
Niedźwiady, Konin County in Greater Poland Voivodeship (west-central Poland)
Niedźwiady, Turek County in Greater Poland Voivodeship (west-central Poland)
Niedźwiady, Lubusz Voivodeship (west Poland)
Niedźwiady, Pomeranian Voivodeship (north Poland)
Niedźwiady, Warmian-Masurian Voivodeship (north Poland)
Niedźwiady, West Pomeranian Voivodeship (north-west Poland)